() in the Swedish Army and the Swedish Amphibious Corps, and  in the Swedish Navy and the Swedish Air Force is the senior specialist officer rank in the Swedish Armed Forces. The official translation to English of the rank of Regementsförvaltare is "Regimental Sergeant Major"; of Flottiljförvaltare in the Nayv, "Chief Warrant Officer", and in the Air Force, "Wing Sergeant Major."  

Regmentsförvaltare/Flottiljförvaltare ranks above majors and Förvaltare. Regmentsförvaltare/Flottiljförvaltare has the same relative rank as a lieutenant colonel.

References

Military ranks of the Swedish Army